The 1920 Boston University football team was an American football team that represented Boston University as an independent during the 1920 college football season. The team compiled a 4–3–1 record and outscored opponents by a total of 49 to 48.

In July 1920, Percy Wendell was hired at the school's head football coach. Wendell had been an All-American football fullback at Harvard. He had not been active in football since leaving Harvard. Wendell's arrival led to a new enthusiasm for football among the student body.

Wendell spent only one season at Boston University, departing in 1921 for Williams College.

Schedule

References

Boston University
Boston University Terriers football seasons
Boston University football